Doktór Murek (English: Doctor Murek) is a 1939 Polish drama film directed by Juliusz Gardan. It is based on two novels by Tadeusz Dołęga-Mostowicz.

Cast
 Franciszek Brodniewicz - doctor Franciszek Murek 
 Nora Ney - Arleta 
 Jadwiga Andrzejewska - Mika 
 Janina Wilczówna - Nira 
 Ina Benita - Karolka
 Lidia Wysocka - Tunka Czabran
 Aleksander Zelwerowicz - chairman Jacek Czabran 
 Mieczysława Ćwiklińska - Mrs. Czabran
 Kazimierz Junosza-Stępowski - chairman Jaźwicz
 Bronisław Dardziński - Kuzyk 
 Maria Żabczynska - Kuzyk's wife
 Tadeusz Kański - Black Kazik 
 Jerzy Kaliszewski - Jurek Czolkowski 
 Stanisław Sielański - Cipak, shelter pal 
 Wanda Jarszewska - the fortune-teller

Bibliography
 Skaff, Sheila. The Law of the Looking Glass: Cinema in Poland, 1896-1939. Ohio University Press, 2008.

External links

Polish drama films
1930s Polish-language films
Films directed by Juliusz Gardan
Films based on Polish novels
Films based on works by Tadeusz Dołęga-Mostowicz
1939 drama films
1939 films
Polish black-and-white films
Władysław Szpilman
Films based on multiple works